Iran coup may refer to:

 1921 Persian coup d'état, a series of events in 1921, which eventually led to the establishment of the Pahlavi dynasty
 1953 Iranian coup d'état, removal of Prime Minister Mohammed Mossadegh, supported by the United States and the United Kingdom through the covert Operation Ajax
 Nojeh Coup (1980), attempted overthrow of the newly established Islamic Republic of Iran by Shapour Bakhtiar with support from Jordan and Iraq